Cerithiopsis apicina is a species of very small sea snail, a marine gastropod mollusk or micromollusk in the family Cerithiopsidae. This species was described by William Healy Dall in 1927.

Description 
The maximum recorded shell length is 5.5 mm.

Habitat 
Minimum recorded depth is 805 m. Maximum recorded depth is 805 m.

References

apicina
Gastropods described in 1927